Tomáš Anzari (born Třinec, 24 June 1970) is a former professional tennis player from the Czech Republic and writer on psychology and stress in sports. He was also known as Tomáš Zdražila.

Career
Anzari, with countryman David Rikl, won the boys' doubles at the ITF World Championships in 1988, the same year that they were number-one-ranked juniors. The pair were runners-up in the 1988 Wimbledon Championships, losing the boys' doubles final to Jason Stoltenberg and Todd Woodbridge. He remained with Rikl after turning professional and at the 1990 French Open, their first Grand Slam tournament in the men's, they reached the third round. It would remain Anzari's best performance in a Grand Slam.

He reached eight doubles semi-finals on the ATP Tour, but only once made it into the final, in 1992, when he and Carl Limberger were runners-up at the BMW Open.

ATP career finals

Doubles: 1 (1 runner-up)

ATP Challenger finals

Singles: 1 (0–1)

Doubles: 23 (14–9)

Performance timelines

Singles

Doubles

Junior Grand Slam finals

Doubles: 1 (1 runner-up)

References

1970 births
Living people
Czechoslovak male tennis players
Czech male tennis players
Sportspeople from Třinec